The black knight is a literary stock character who masks his identity and that of his liege by not displaying heraldry. Black knights are usually portrayed as villainous figures who use this anonymity for misdeeds. They are often contrasted with the knight-errant (white knight). The character appeared in Arthurian literature and has been adapted and adopted by various authors, in cinema and popular culture. The character is sometimes associated with death or darkness.

Historical figures
Edward of Woodstock, Prince of Wales, Duke of Cornwall, Prince of Aquitaine. The eldest son of King Edward III, father to King Richard II of England, was a military leader remembered for both his success and the massacres he ordered, popularly known as the "Black Prince".
James Stewart, the Black Knight of Lorn, a descendant of Robert I of Scotland, lived in the late 14th and early 15th centuries.
Knights Hospitaller, distinguished by their black mantles.
Zawisza the Black of Garbów also known as "the Black Knight" or "First knight of Europe", was a Polish knight and nobleman. He served as a soldier and diplomat under the Polish king Władysław II Jagiello and Hungarian-Bohemian king Sigismund of Luxembourg. During his life, he was regarded as a model of knightly virtues and was renowned for winning multiple tournaments in Europe. His nickname is due to his black hair and his custom-made, black armor, which is kept at the Jasna Góra Monastery.
Sir Ralph de Ashton was an officer of state under Edward IV of England
Knight of Glin.

Music

British composer Edward Elgar composed a cantata titled The Black Knight (op. 25, 1889–93). Its libretto is a translation of Ludwig Uhland's ballad Der schwarze Ritter by Henry Wadsworth Longfellow. The Uhland poem (in german language) was set to music also by Heinrich von Herzogenberg.

Literature
 Le Morte d'Arthur by Thomas Malory: "There sat a knight all armed in black harness, and his name was the Knight of the Black Laund. Then the damosel, when she saw that knight, she bade him flee down that valley, for his horse was not saddled. Gramercy, said Beaumains, for always ye would have me a coward. With that the Black Knight, when she came nigh him, spake and said, Damosel, have ye brought this knight of King Arthur to be your champion? Nay, fair knight, said she, this is but a kitchen knave that was fed in King Arthur's kitchen for alms. Why cometh he, said the knight, in such array? it is shame that he beareth you company. "
 Idylls of the King by Alfred Lord Tennyson
 Ivanhoe by Sir Walter Scott: Richard the Lionhearted poses as an unknown black knight to avoid detection while in England, fighting alongside Ivanhoe in a tournament and helping the assault on Front-de-Boeuf's castle.
 Raymond Chandler in his first novel, The Big Sleep (1939), lets his private eye Philip Marlowe describe and comment on "a knight in dark armour rescuing a lady who was tied to a tree and didn't have any clothes on but some very long and convenient hair."
 The Book of the Duchess by Geoffrey Chaucer
 Die Jungfrau von Orleans (The Maid of Orleans) by Friedrich Schiller (1801). The Black Knight appears as a wraith to warn Johanna (Joan of Arc) to cease her campaign to liberate France. Schiller himself offered the interpretation that it represented the ghost of Sir John Talbot.
 The GrailQuest series of adventure gamebooks by J. H. Brennan features a character known as the Black Knight in the first three books. In the first two, however, the character turns out to be King Pellinore. In the third book, the real Black Knight is the final enemy the reader must defeat in order to complete the adventure.
 Marvel Comics has different characters that went by the name Black Knight.
 The Shriek in Dan Simmons' Hyperion Cantos is a take off on the character of the black night, set in a science fiction setting.
 Kato, the antagonist in Astrid Lindgren's Mio, My Son.

Film
 Monty Python and the Holy Grail features the Black Knight, who fights King Arthur while taunting him. Despite Arthur cutting all his limbs off, the Black Knight continues to taunt him without suffering any pain.
Code Geass: Lelouch of the Rebellion features a group of rebels who mask their identities under the name "The Black Knights". Their goal is to free Japan from the rule of the Holy Britannian Empire

Television
The premiere episode of Scooby-Doo, Where Are You!, entitled "What a Knight for a Knight," features the Black Knight as its villain. A similar villain of the same name would appear later in an episode of The Scooby-Doo Show, entitled "Scared a Lot in Camelot."

Video games
 In the MMORPG World of Warcraft The Black Knight is a dungeon boss "Trial of the Champion". The game also features a sword of the same name.
 In Fortnite Battle Royale, the tier 70 Battle Pass outfit of Season 2 was the Black Knight.
 In Final Fantasy Tactics, the title belongs to the character Gaffgarion, while in the later released version Final Fantasy Tactics: War of the Lions, the job "Dark Knight" is a class the player's characters can choose later in the game.
 The Black Knight is one of the primary antagonists of Fire Emblem: Path of Radiance and Fire Emblem: Radiant Dawn.
 In the Dark Souls franchise, Black Knights are hostile mobs whose armor was singed black (presumably from flame explosion or fighting fire-using demons) as they lost their liege, Lord Gwyn, who sacrificed himself to rekindle the First Flame.
 In the popular MMORPG RuneScape, the Black Knights are central antagonists in a number of quest lines and were the most powerful hostile NPCs in the game when it was first released.
 The popular Williams pinball franchise Black Knight utilizes this character as its antagonist.
 Black Knight is the name of the Knight's final promotion in Might and Magic VII: For Blood and Honor when the Dark path is chosen. They're an evil counterpart to the Champion, equivalent in every aspect.
 In the 2014 video game Shovel Knight, Black Knight is one of the main antagonists, first facing off Shovel Knight in the beginning of the first level.
 A Black Knight makes an appearance in Kingdom Come: Deliverance, a 14th century simulation role-playing game, after being defeated in the Rattay Tournament. Another Black Knight is also featured in the game, acting as a primary antagonist and a member of the mercenary army of king Sigismund of Luxembourg.
 In the 2005 fighting game, Shrek Super Slam, the Black Knight features as an playable character, wielding a two-handed axe and speaking only in grunts.
 In Sonic and the Black Knight, the character appears as a major antagonist in the game's plot.
 In Sly Cooper: Thieves in Time, the villain of the fourth chapter identifies herself as the Black Knight. She is later unmasked as Bentley's missing girlfriend, Penelope, who had betrayed him because she's convinced he's wasting his talent on Sly, and had built the armor to use as a disguise to hide her treachery from the Cooper Gang. In response, Bentley denounced Penelope as a sociopath, and destroyed her Black Knight armor in rage for deceiving him.

Sports 
 The Black Knights are the United States Military Academy at West Point's mascots in a number of sports teams.
 The Black Knight is a moniker given to golfer Gary Player in the 1960s by the media for his penchant for black attire on and off the golf course and for his courteous demeanor. The Black Knight logo identifies all the companies of the Gary Player Group.

Finance
In  business, a white knight is a friendly investor or savior, while a black knight functions as a destroyer. Typically, a black knight will enter a business or company as an influential person such as a major investor or as a member of the board of directors and will dismantle a profitable or asset-rich business to enrich themselves, which typically leaves the previously profitable company in a weaker financial position.

Such black knights achieve their aims by:
 siphoning out cash through high personal expenses, salaries and bonuses
 selling off profitable parts of the business to a private company related to the black knight
 buying unprofitable businesses / assets previously owned by the black knight
 selling assets at below market value to persons related to the black knight
 buying assets at inflated prices

Occasionally, the term black knight describes an investor who acquires a firm in opposition to the will of its  management, as in a hostile takeover. The label may not be accurate if the ultimate intention of the acquirer is unknown. It could be for commercial reasons (rather than personal reasons), such as merging the entity with another entity owned by the acquirer to promote synergy.

See also
Dark Knight (disambiguation)
Black and white dualism
Black Company
Black Horseman of the Apocalypse
Hans von Trotha

References

Fictional knights
Stock characters
Medieval legends